is a singer-songwriter, composer, and lyricist based in Tokyo, Japan. Mayu grew up in Osaka, Japan, and studied law at Kyoto University. In 2007, she quit law school to pursue her career as a singer-songwriter and moved to Los Angeles.

While studying music at LA Music Academy, Mayu self-produced her first EP "Stars Won't Fall", from which "24 Hours" got featured in Sony Walkman as a preload song, attracting an international fanbase.

In 2011, she recorded her second EP "Into the Wild" with an L.A. based producer, John Avila. An acoustic tune "Once" won the first prize in International Acoustic Music Award Open Category and made it to the final of Great American Songwriting Contest. Also, the piano ballad "What I See in Love" made it to the final of UK Songwriting Contest and Australian Songwriting Contest. Later, this song was featured as a sub theme song in In the Name of Love, a TV Drama aired in Singapore and Malaysia. In 2014, she released "Halfway to You", a compilation album of her first EP as her first full-length album. In promotion of the album, she performed at SXSW as part of the Japan Nite tour in the United States and at The Great Escape Festival in UK. She also released her CD and performed in Korea and Singapore too. In 2015, she co-wrote "Love Song" for the Korean female group, Miss A's EP, Colors, and "Like a Fool" for the Korean female group, Twice's debut EP, The Story Begins. In 2017, she co-wrote "Real World" for Oh My Girl's fourth EP, Coloring Book, and in 2018, she co-wrote the song "Secret Garden" for their fifth EP of the same name. She is also credited as co-producer in TXT's debut song "Crown", for their EP The Dream Chapter in 2019. In 2020, Wakisaka was credited as a co-writer for GFriend's song "Crème Brûlée" from the EP 回:Song of the Sirens, as well as the songs "Three of Cups" and "Wheel of the Year" from their album 回:Walpurgis Night.

References

Living people
Musicians from Osaka
Japanese women singer-songwriters
Japanese singer-songwriters
Kyoto University alumni
21st-century Japanese singers
1980 births
21st-century Japanese women singers